The Battle of Gorong (Indonesian: Pertempuran Gorong; Dutch: Gorong Oorlog) or also called Battle of Gorom, is a series of 30 years war Sultan Nuku of the Tidore Sultanate. More than half of the Nuku war took place in East Seram. The people of East Seram are known to be the most loyal in protecting Nuku from VOC and Ternate pursuit.

Causes
The Dutch were quite frustrated with losing a lot of guilders, troops, and trade stability in the East during the pursuit of Nuku. For that, a larger army with a larger fleet is needed strong. So in 1789 three ships were brought from Netherlands to Batavia to prepare an expedition to Maluku.

Battle
The VOC expedition was led by Admiral A.H.C. Straring, who was at war with the Sultan of Palembang, summoned to Batavia to then wait for the arrival of three ships from the Netherlands.

December 1790, the fleet from Batavia to Ternate. In total there are 4 ships with 700 Dutch troops. The 4 ships are Thetis Ship, Bellona, Markurius and Swalluw. Each led by Captain Silvester, Captain Hartman, Captain Isaak Welter Gobius, and Captain Wolterbeek all of whom are under the command of Admiral Straring.

The fleet arrived in Ternate in January 1791 by first stopping at Makassar. 3000 Ternate troops and Makassar joined forces to Ambon. Resident Ambon and Saparua added hundreds of local kora-kora to join forces towards Banda Islands.

In May 1791, the large army headed for Gorom Island, the point where Sultan Nuku was located. Nuku who was previously in Rarackit/Kilbat Country at this time, had to concentrate the troop gathering point there. Nuku was accompanied by two of his confidants, the rich (orang kaya) Lukman from Kelu Country and Imam Sarasa from Geser Country. A year earlier, the heads of these two men were valued at 500 guilders each for those who could kill them and the price of the head of the sultan of Nuku 1000 guilders.

The Straring Army first set fire to several countries namely Seran Rey, Geser, Urung, Guli-guli, and Kilmuri. After that go to the main point, namely Gorom.

Several villages such as Ondor, Kataloka, and its surroundings welcomed the VOC right in front of the Ondor Country. VOC burned several villages and captured local strongholds in Dullah, Ondor and Kelalir. After that head to Kataloka where the concentration of Nuku and most of his troops are.

On 23 May 1791, the peak of the battle took place on the coast of Kataloka. The two main VOC ships were burned. Captain Gobius is trapped in the creek between Ondor and Kataloka. Nuku's army and King Bessy from two opposite directions attacked Gobius' army. The captain, experienced in European warfare, fell with a gunshot wound to the left thigh and was stabbed in the left abdomen. Unfortunately he died on the spot. Hundreds of Gobius troops died on the shores of Gorom. Captain Walterbek caught up to help but was too late, Admiral Straring withdrew the troops and returned to Banda.

Afterwards, there was almost no significant resistance from the VOC troops in East Seram until the recapture of Nuku's throne in Tidore.

Literatures
Tri Indah (2020), Masa Penjajahan di Kesultanan Ternate
M. Adnan Amal (2016), Kepulauan Rempah-rempah: Perjalanan Sejarah Maluku Utara 1250-1950
E. katoppo (1984), Nuku: Sultan Saidul Jehad Muhammad el Mabus Amiruddin Syah Kaicil Paparangan
Sartono Kartodirdjo (1987), Pengantar Sejarah Indonesia Baru 1500–1900
Andaya, Leonard Y. (1993), The World of Maluku
Abdul Hamid Hasan (2001), Aroma Sejarah dan Budaya Ternate
M. Adnan Amal (2002), Maluku Utara: Perjalanan Sejarah 1250-1800

See also
Nuku Rebellion
Invasion of the Spice Islands
Dutch conquest of the Banda Islands

References

Naval battles involving the Netherlands
Conflicts in 1791
18th-century history of the Royal Navy